Ragazzini is an Italian surname. Notable people with the surname include:

Giovanni Battista Ragazzini ( 1520– 1591), Italian painter
John R. Ragazzini (1912–1988), American electrical engineer 

Italian-language surnames